The men's triple jump event at the 1988 Summer Olympics in Seoul, South Korea had an entry list of 45 competitors, with 43 athletes from 31 nations starting in two qualifying groups (43 jumpers) before the final (12) took place on Saturday September 24, 1988. The maximum number of athletes per nation had been set at 3 since the 1930 Olympic Congress. The event was won by Khristo Markov of Bulgaria, the nation's first medal and victory in the men's triple jump. Igor Lapshin and Aleksandr Kovalenko of the Soviet Union took silver and bronze in an event that the Soviets had reached the podium eight consecutive Games before the 1984 boycott.

Background

This was the 21st appearance of the event, which is one of 12 athletics events to have been held at every Summer Olympics. The returning finalists from the 1984 Games were sixth-place finisher Willie Banks of the United States, ninth-place finisher Joseph Taiwo of Nigeria, and tenth-place finisher John Herbert of Great Britain. Banks had broken the world record in 1985, but "was no longer at his best in 1988." The favorite was Khristo Markov of Bulgaria, the 1987 World and 1986 European champion. The Soviet team, which had dominated the event before the 1984 boycott, also had three strong contenders.

Algeria, Angola, Belize, Bermuda, Cyprus, Ecuador, Kuwait, Libya, Mozambique, and Saint Vincent and the Grenadines each made their first appearance in the event; the Republic of China made its first appearance as Chinese Taipei. The United States competed for the 20th time, having missed only the boycotted 1980 Games.

Competition format

The competition used the two-round format introduced in 1936. In the qualifying round, each jumper received three attempts to reach the qualifying distance of 16.90 metres; if fewer than 12 men did so, the top 12 (including all those tied) would advance. In the final round, each athlete had three jumps; the top eight received an additional three jumps, with the best of the six to count.

Records

Prior to the competition, the existing world and Olympic records were as follows.

Aleksandr Kovalenko broke the Olympic record with his first jump in the final round, at 17.42 metres. This lasted only until Khristo Markov's first jump (Kovalenko jumped sixth, Markov jumped tenth) of 17.61 metres, which held up as the gold medal winning jump and new Olympic record. Kovalenko's second jump (17.40 metres) and Igor Lapshin's sixth jump (17.52 metres) also surpassed the old Olympic record.

Schedule

All times are Korea Standard Time adjusted for daylight savings (UTC+10)

Results

Qualifying

Final

See also
 1984 Men's Olympic Triple Jump (Los Angeles)
 1986 Men's European Championships Triple Jump (Stuttgart)
 1987 Men's World Championships Triple Jump (Rome)
 1990 Men's European Championships Triple Jump (Split)
 1991 Men's World Championships Triple Jump (Tokyo)
 1992 Men's Olympic Triple Jump (Barcelona)

References

External links
  Official Report

T
Triple jump at the Olympics
Men's events at the 1988 Summer Olympics